Marwan El-Amrawy (born April 14, 1995) in Alexandria, Egypt, is an Egyptian marathon swimmer. He placed 23rd in the men's marathon 10 kilometre event at the 2016 Summer Olympics after placing 1st in Africa. In 2019, he represented Egypt at the 2019 African Games held in Rabat, Morocco.

References

1995 births
Living people
Egyptian male swimmers
Olympic swimmers of Egypt
Swimmers at the 2016 Summer Olympics
Swimmers at the 2019 African Games
Male long-distance swimmers
African Games competitors for Egypt
African Games medalists in swimming
20th-century Egyptian people
21st-century Egyptian people
African Games gold medalists for Egypt
African Games bronze medalists for Egypt